The Binghamton Bearcats Men's Lacrosse team is a Division 1 college lacrosse team that represents Binghamton University in Binghamton, New York, United States. The school's teams compete as members of the America East Conference. The Bearcats hired Kevin McKeown in July 2016 to become the 3rd head coach in the history of the program.

History

Conference affiliations
 America East (2002–Present)

Year-by-year results

All-time coaching records

References

External links
 Official website

College men's lacrosse teams in the United States